Dum may refer to:

 Dum (2003 Hindi film)
 Dum (2003 Tamil film)
 Dum (2016 film), a South Indian Malayalam film
 Middle Dutch, West Germanic dialects, 1150–1500, ISO 639 language codes
 IATA code for Pinang Kampai Airport, Dumai, Riau, Indonesia
 Dum pukht, an Indian slow-cooking technique
 Dum biryani, a rice dish cooked with that technique
 Sascha Dum (born 1986), German former footballer

See also
 Dumb (disambiguation)
 Dum Dum (disambiguation)